Dr William Fraser Hume FRSE (1867–1949) was a British geologist specialising in Egypt.

Life
He was born in Cheltenham in England on 1 October 1867 the son of George Hume.

He received his early education in Russia and at College Galliard in Lausanne in Switzerland. He then attended the Royal College of Science and Royal College of Mines in the University of London under John Wesley Judd graduating BSc around 1887. He began lecturing at the Royal College of Science in 1890 and received a doctorate (DSc) in 1893.

In 1897, he moved to Egypt to assist with a huge geological survey of the whole country and in 1909 became Director of the entire Geological Survey of Egypt. In 1910, he was elected a Fellow of the Royal Society of Edinburgh. His proposers were John Horne, Ben Peach, John Walter Gregory, Sir John Smith Flett and James Ireland.

During the First World War he advised on water supply to the British Army in Egypt and the Middle East. He was awarded the Lyell Medal by the Geological Society of London in 1919.

He served as President of the Royal Geographical Society of Egypt 1926 to 1940 and President of the Institute of Egypt in 1928.

He retired in 1927 and returned to England to Sussex around 1930 and died there on 23 February 1949. He is buried in Littlehampton Cemetery.

Publications

Rift Valleys and Geology of the Eastern Sinai (1901)
The Topography and Geology of the Peninsula of Sinai (1906)
Report on the Oilfield Region of Egypt (1916)
Geology of Egypt (1925)
Phosphate Deposits in Egypt (1927)

Family

He married Ethel Gladys Williams.

References

1867 births
1949 deaths
People from Cheltenham
Alumni of the University of London
British geologists
Fellows of the Royal Society of Edinburgh
Lyell Medal winners